The women's high jump competition at the 2004 Summer Olympics in Athens was held at the Olympic Stadium on 26–28 August.

Competition format
The competition consisted of two rounds, qualification and final.  Athletes start with a qualifying round. Jumping in turn, each athlete attempts to achieve the qualifying height. If they fail at three jumps in a row, they are eliminated. After a successful jump, they receive three more attempts to achieve the next height. Once all jumps have been completed, all athletes who have achieved the qualifying height go through to the final. If fewer than 12 athletes achieve the qualifying standard, the best 12 athletes go through.  Cleared heights reset for the final, which followed the same format until all athletes fail three consecutive jumps.

Schedule

All times are Greece Standard Time (UTC+2)

Records
, the existing World and Olympic records were as follows.

The following records were established during the competition:

Results

Qualifying round
Rule: Qualifying standard 1.95 (Q) or at least best 12 qualified (q).

Final

References

External links
Official Olympic Report

W
High jump at the Olympics
2004 in women's athletics
Women's events at the 2004 Summer Olympics